Julie Gai Wiseman ( Kaatz; died 30 November 2018) was an Australian cricketer. She represented her home state Queensland in three first-class matches and 23 List A matches during the 1990s.

Raised in Ipswich, Queensland, Kaatz joined the Queensland Police Service in 1994, eventually becoming a senior constable. She was married to Rod Wiseman. She died of cancer in 2018.

References

External links
 
 

Year of birth missing
Place of birth missing
2018 deaths
Place of death missing
Australian cricketers
Australian women cricketers
Queensland Fire cricketers
Australian police officers
Cricketers from Queensland
Sportspeople from Ipswich, Queensland
Sportswomen from Queensland